Balla GAA is a Gaelic Athletic Association club located in the village of Balla in County Mayo, Ireland.

History
The club was founded in 1921.

Achievements
 Mayo Senior Football Championship: Runners-Up 1983
 Mayo Intermediate Football Championship: Winners 2020
 Mayo Junior Football Championship: Winners 1980, 2018

Notable players
 Ronan Golding 
 Pat Fallon
 T. J. Kilgallon
 Maurice Sheridan
 Matthew Flanagan
 Val Roughneen
 Peter fahey
 Daniel Roche 
 Declan Flatley
 Conor "The Butcher" Brennan
 Mark "The Swan" Lally
 Pat Murtagh
 Deccy Flan
 David "The Mortifier" Monaghan
 Gerry ' the bull ' nyland
 Conor Dunleavy
 Conor Walsh
 Gary McHale
 Anto Dempsey
 John lock the knees Ruane
 Towbar

References

External sources
 Balla GAA club site

Gaelic football clubs in County Mayo
Gaelic games clubs in County Mayo